Presian Ridge (Presiyanov Rid \pre-si-'ya-nov 'rid\) is a ridge of elevation 1456 m extending 950 m in east-weat direction in Friesland Ridge, Tangra Mountains, Livingston Island in the South Shetland Islands, Antarctica. Situated between the island's summit Mount Friesland (1700 m) to the west and Catalunyan Saddle to the east.  Surmounting Wörner Gap, Camp Academia locality and upper Huron Glacier to the north, and Macy Glacier to the south.

First ascent by the Catalans Francesc Sàbat and Jorge Enrique from Juan Carlos I Base on 30 December 1991.

The ridge is named after Khan Presian of Bulgaria, 836-852 AD, who brought the Bulgarian lands in Macedonia together with those in Thrace, Moesia, Panonia, Dacia and Scythia.

Location

Maps
 South Shetland Islands. Scale 1:200000 topographic map. DOS 610 Sheet W 62 60. Tolworth, UK, 1968.
 Islas Livingston y Decepción.  Mapa topográfico a escala 1:100000.  Madrid: Servicio Geográfico del Ejército, 1991.
 S. Soccol, D. Gildea and J. Bath. Livingston Island, Antarctica. Scale 1:100000 satellite map. The Omega Foundation, USA, 2004.
 L.L. Ivanov et al., Antarctica: Livingston Island and Greenwich Island, South Shetland Islands (from English Strait to Morton Strait, with illustrations and ice-cover distribution), 1:100000 scale topographic map, Antarctic Place-names Commission of Bulgaria, Sofia, 2005
 L.L. Ivanov. Antarctica: Livingston Island and Greenwich, Robert, Snow and Smith Islands. Scale 1:120000 topographic map. Troyan: Manfred Wörner Foundation, 2010.  (First edition 2009. )
 Antarctic Digital Database (ADD). Scale 1:250000 topographic map of Antarctica. Scientific Committee on Antarctic Research (SCAR), 1993–2016.
 L.L. Ivanov. Antarctica: Livingston Island and Smith Island. Scale 1:100000 topographic map. Manfred Wörner Foundation, 2017.

Gallery

References
 Presian Ridge. SCAR Composite Antarctic Gazetteer
 Bulgarian Antarctic Gazetteer. Antarctic Place-names Commission. (details in Bulgarian, basic data in English)

External links
 Presian Ridge. Copernix satellite image

Tangra Mountains
Ridges of Antarctica